The Anglican Diocese of Etsako was created and inaugurated on the 14th March, 2007 and is one of 13 Dioceses within the Anglican Province of Bendel, itself one of 14 provinces within the Church of Nigeria. The pioneer bishop was Rt. Rev. Jacob O.B. Bada.

Felix Unuokhe Olorunfemi was elected to replace Bishop Bada. Rt. Rev. Felix U. Olorunfemi  was born on Wednesday 8 June 1966. He was educated at  Bendel State University and the Ezekiel College of Theology, Ekpoma. He has served in  Igbodo, Ekwuoma, Erumu and was Archdeacon of  Agbor before becoming the Bishop of the Diocese of Etsako. The Cathedral is All Saints' Cathedral located at Auchi while the Bishop's Court is at Jattu which is a neighboring town to Auchi.

References 

Church of Nigeria dioceses
Dioceses of the Province of Bendel